Chief Tonasket Log Cabin is a log cabin in Okanogan County, Washington, once the home of Chief Tonasket, born 1822. It is along Washington State Route 21 near Curlew, Washington. Tonasket moved to the Colville Indian Reservation, now the Old North Half in the Curlew area, after signing the 1883 treaty with the United States. Tonasket died in 1891, and the structure was operated as the "Curlew Store" for a period of time by G.S. Helphry  and J. Walters, beginning in 1896, supplying prospectors coming to the Okanogan gold rush.

The store was dismantled when the Great Northern Railway came through the area  and the original log cabin uncovered.

References

Sources
 

 
 
Treaty with the Columbia's and Colvilles, Report of the Commissioner of Indian Affairs United States Bureau of Indian Affairs, 1886 (treaty text)

 
1895 establishments in Washington (state)
Buildings and structures in Okanogan County, Washington
Culture of the Okanagan
Houses completed in 1895 
Log cabins in the United States